In mathematics—specifically, in functional analysis—a weakly measurable function taking values in a Banach space is a function whose composition with any element of the dual space is a measurable function in the usual (strong) sense.  For separable spaces, the notions of weak and strong measurability agree.

Definition 

A measurable function on a probability space is usually referred to as a random variable (or random vector if it takes values in a vector space such as the Banach space ).
Thus, as a special case of the above definition, if  is a probability space, then a function  is called a (-valued) weak random variable (or weak random vector) if, for every continuous linear functional  the function

Properties 

The relationship between measurability and weak measurability is given by the following result, known as Pettis' theorem or Pettis measurability theorem.

A function  is said to be almost surely separably valued (or essentially separably valued) if there exists a subset  with  such that  is separable.

See also

References 

 
 

Functional analysis
Measure theory
Types of functions